Crusio may refer to:

 Crusio (ice cream parlor)
 Wim Crusio, a Dutch behavioral neurogeneticist